This is a list of Swedish cruisers of the period 1896-1945.

Torpedo cruisers
  (1896)
  (1898)
  (1898)
  (1899)
  (1899)

Armoured cruisers
  (1905)

Mine cruisers
  (1912)

Aircraft cruisers
  (1933)

Cruisers

  (1944)
  (1945)

Gallery

External links

 
 
Cruisers
Cruisers list